BBC South East Today is the BBC South East regional television news programme, serving Kent, East Sussex, part of West Sussex and a small part of Surrey. Prior to its launch on 3 September 2001, most of the viewers in the region received Newsroom South East, though some had been receiving South Today.

South East Today is produced and broadcast live from the BBC's South East Regional Production Centre in Royal Tunbridge Wells with district reporters covering Brighton, Chatham, Dover and Hastings.

Overview 
Launched on 3 September 2001, South East Today airs with short programmes and bulletins at varying times.

The programme can be watched in any part of the UK (and Europe) on digital satellite on the BBC UK regional TV on satellite service.

Launched with a sole main presenter Laurie Mayer, the programme was briefly the centre of a minor BBC scandal, after Mayer resigned amid accusations of management bullying. Mayer lost his case, but the managers concerned have since moved on.

The show then became double-headed, with Beverley Thompson (formerly the programme's health correspondent) and Giles Dilnot presenting. In 2004, Geoff Clark joined the programme . Clark and Thompson presented the programme together for five years until their departure in September 2009. Long-serving weather presenter Kaddy Lee-Preston, who had been with South East Today since its launch left the programme in March 2012.

The main presenter is Natalie Graham  with weather presenters Nina Ridge and Sara Thornton. The programme's editor is Quentin Smith and the sports producer is Ben Moore. Rob Smith left the programme in November 2020.

The main transmitters that carry the regional news are Heathfield, Bluebell Hill and Dover, with associated relays including Hastings, Tunbridge Wells and Whitehawk Hill. As of 7 March 2012 (following digital switchover), the Whitehawk Hill relay transmitter (which serves the Brighton & Hove area) now carries BBC South East output instead of BBC South, and the region extends as far west as Worthing.

In 2020, the weekday lunchtime bulletin of South East Today merged with that of BBC London News to join forces with the latest on COVID-19 as BBC London and South East, hosted by the South East Today team in Tunbridge Wells. All other bulletins remained separate between the two regions. The two separate newsrooms were restored in September 2020. Very occasionally a joint bulletin will still be broadcast, usually due to staff shortages in one newsroom or the other.

Presenters

News
Caroline Feraday (newsreader)
Claudia Sermbezis (newsreader)
Ellie Crisell (newsreader/cover presenter)

Weather
Georgina Burnett (freelance)
John Hammond (freelance)
Nina Ridge

Former presenters

Christopher Blanchett (Reporting Scotland)
Giles Dilnot (Daily Politics)
Polly Evans
Michael Fish

Kaye Forster
Nazaneen Ghaffar (Sky News)
Rachel Mackley
Tomasz Schafernaker (BBC Weather)
Rob Smith (journalist)

See also 
 BBC News

References

External links

BBC Regional News shows
Mass media in Kent
Mass media in Sussex
2010s British television series
2020s British television series
2001 British television series debuts
Television news in England